BBC Radio 1 Dance is a British online-only radio stream, owned and operated by the BBC and run as a spin-off from Radio 1. The station plays a mix of back-to-back current, future and classic electronic dance music, and broadcasts exclusively on BBC Sounds.

History and launch

From as early as November 2019, reports showed that the BBC was considering launching 'spin-off stations' of their popular music stations in order to gain more listeners. Jonathan Wall, controller of BBC Sounds, confirmed in February 2020 that Radio 1 Dance was to launch in spring 2020. The launch was delayed due to BBC Radio 1 and sister station BBC Radio 1Xtra operating reduced broadcast schedules during the COVID-19 pandemic.

The BBC announced in September 2020 that the Dance music stream would launch on 9 October 2020 with Annie Mac, Danny Howard and Pete Tong hosting a 4-hour dance marathon from 6 pm, simulcast on Radio 1 and Radio 1 Dance.

The launch of Radio 1 Dance was met with criticism from commercial bodies. Andy Carter, chair of the All-party parliamentary group on Commercial Radio, said: "New services like Radio 1 Dance do not appear to meet the important public value tests that the BBC must observe."

In late September 2020, following complaints from commercial bodies, Ofcom reviewed Radio 1 Dance, saying "we do not require the BBC to conduct a Public Interest Test [...] because we consider the impact of the Radio 1 Dance stream on the market is likely to be small, particularly given it will be online only and will contain no new or exclusive content."

The BBC has since launched a further music stream on BBC Sounds in April 2021, Radio 1 Relax.

Programming
Programming on the 'stream' is primarily repeated dance shows from BBC Radio 1. Following the departure of Annie Mac in July 2021, a refreshed schedule was launched in the following September.

Monday to Thursday
Daytime shows are hosted by Arielle Free and Connor Coates, originally broadcast as part of Radio 1 Early Breakfast. There is a 60-minute non-stop mix at midday from Radio 1's Dance Anthems, hosted by Charlie Hedges. At 8 am and 3 pm, the station broadcasts Radio 1's Workout Anthems, a 60-minute mix centred around songs to workout to. The drivetime show (5–7 pm) is a repeat of Pete Tong's Friday night Radio 1 show. Evening and night programming consists of Radio 1 Dance Presents... (7–8 pm), followed by Radio 1's Classic Essential Mix (8-10 pm), then Radio 1's Drum & Bass Show with Charlie Tee (10 pm – 12 am). Radio 1's Residency airs from 12-2 am.

Friday
The daytime shows are hosted by the rotational Friday presenter(s) on Radio 1 Early Breakfast. These are broadcast until 4 pm when Charlie Hedges broadcasts two hours of Dance Anthems. Friday night dance shows on BBC Radio 1 are simulcast on the Dance stream from 6 pm, this includes Radio 1's Dance Party with Danny Howard (6–8 pm), Radio 1's Future Dance with Sarah Story (8–10 pm), Pete Tong (10 pm-midnight), Radio 1's Essential Mix (midnight – 2 am) and Radio 1 Dance Presents... (2–3 am).

Saturday
On Saturdays, Radio 1's Dance Anthems with Charlie Hedges (4–8 pm) is simulcast from BBC Radio 1. This is followed by Danny Howard's Club Mix (8–9 pm), Radio 1's Essential Mix (9–11 pm), 'Radio 1's Residency (11 pm – 1 am) and Radio 1's Classic Essential Mix (1 am – 3 am).

Sunday
The stream broadcasts usual daytime shows with added artist-curated mixes from Radio 1's Wind Down throughout the day. At 9 am and 3 pm, Charlie Hedges hosts 60-minutes of Radio 1's Dance Anthems, with 60-minutes of Workout Anthems broadcast at midday.

Events and specials

Radio 1's Big Weekend
Since 2019, Radio 1 Dance has had a presence at Radio 1's flagship music festival, Radio 1's Big Weekend, hosting the line-up for the Friday night in Middlesbrough. Following the launch of the BBC Sounds stream, the brand has played a bigger part in Big Weekend events. At the 2022 festival in Coventry, Radio 1 Dance hosted a stage across the full weekend and curated the Friday night line-up.

Radio 1's Dance Weekend
Radio 1 has annually held a dance music weekend broadcast live from Ibiza since the 1990s, formally called Radio 1 in Ibiza. In 2020, the event was renamed Radio 1's Dance Weekend, hosted entirely virtually due to the COVID-19 pandemic. The event is usually the first weekend in August and has performances from world-famous DJs and Radio 1 Dance talent such as Pete Tong, Danny Howard and Sarah Story. Radio 1 Dance simulcast 2021's and 2022's events on the main Radio 1 network.

Europe's Biggest Dance Show
Europe's Biggest Dance Show is a series of radio specials produced by Radio 1. First broadcast in October 2019, Radio 1 joined with several European radio stations, all members of the European Broadcasting Union.

The third installment, Europe's Biggest Dance Show 2020, was broadcast on Friday 23 October 2020 on Radio 1 Dance for the first time, as well as Radio 1 and the other stations across Europe, with Annie Mac hosting.

Following the departure of Annie Mac, Danny Howard has since hosted Europe's Biggest Dance Show on Radio 1 Dance and Radio 1 in 2021, and 2022 with Ukraine joining the line-up.

Radio 1 Dance at The Warehouse Project
Radio 1 Dance has curated line-ups at The Warehouse Project in Manchester, following its reopening after COVID-19 lockdown restrictions. These have included an event in November 2021 headlined by CamelPhat, and in October 2022 that was headlined by Fisher.

See also
 BBC Radio 1 Relax

References 

Dance
Digital-only radio stations
1 Dance
Radio stations established in 2020